The 2016 Iraq FA Cup Final was the 25th final of the Iraq FA Cup as a clubs-only competition. The match was contested between the Baghdad rivals, Al-Zawraa and Al-Quwa Al-Jawiya, at Al-Shaab Stadium in Baghdad. It was played on 29 May 2016 to be the final match of the competition. Al-Quwa Al-Jawiya made their 7th appearance in the Iraq FA Cup final while Al-Zawraa extended their record to 16 final appearances. Al-Quwa Al-Jawiya won the match 2–0 with goals from Bashar Rasan and Humam Tariq, for the club's 4th title.

The winners of the cup, Al-Quwa Al-Jawiya, qualified for the 2017 AFC Cup. Al-Quwa Al-Jawiya were also set to face the winners of the league, Al-Zawraa, in the 2016 Iraqi Super Cup, but it was eventually cancelled.

Background
Al-Zawraa played in a record 16th Iraq FA Cup final. They had previously won a record 14 finals, most recently in the 2000 Iraq FA Cup final against the same team that they will be facing this final, Al-Quwa Al-Jawiya, with a 4–3 penalty shoot-out win after a 0–0 draw. Their only prior loss in the final was in 1988, losing 4–3 by a penalty shoot-out, after a 1–1 draw, against Al-Rasheed.

Al-Quwa Al-Jawiya made their 7th appearance in the Iraq FA Cup final, of which they had won three, most recently in 1997 with an 8–7 penalty shoot-out win, after a 1–1 draw, against Al Shorta. Their most recent loss in the final was against Al-Zawraa in 2000.

The two teams faced each other in the fourth round of the final stage of the 2015–16 Iraqi Premier League at Al-Shaab Stadium and in front of more than 30,000 spectators, where Al-Zawraa achieved an important 1–0 win with Alaa Ali Mhawi's 60th-minute goal, leaving Al-Quwa Al-Jawiya with little hopes of winning the league title and moving Al-Zawraa to 2nd place.

Before the game, the Iraq Football Association decided that if the final was to finish as a draw after 90 minutes, the match would go straight to a penalty shootout, with no extra-time played.

Route to the Final

Note: In all results below, the score of the finalist is given first (H: home; A: away).

Al-Zawraa
Al-Zawraa entered the competition in the Round of 32 as an Iraqi Premier League team. In their first match, they were drawn against an Iraq Division One team, Al-Difaa Al-Madani home. At their temporary home stadium, Al-Sinaa Stadium, Al-Zawraa won 2–0 with goals from Luay Salah and Oday Jafal. In the Round of 16, they drew another Division One team, Diyala at Al-Sina'a Stadium, winning 4–0 with a hat-trick from Salah and a goal by Hatem Zaidan. In the quarterfinals they were drawn against another Division One team, Al-Hussein, where they lost 2–1 away, at the Five Thousand Stadium, in the first leg, with a goal from Alaa Abdul-Zahra. They pulled it back by winning 3–1 home, at Al-Sinaa Stadium, in the second leg, winning 4–3 on aggregate. The goals were from Jafal, Salah and Zaidan. In the semifinals, Al-Zawraa drew Naft Al-Janoob, where they won 2–0 away, at the Naft Al-Junoob Stadium, in the first leg, with goals from Salah and Hussein Ali. They also won, in the second leg, 2–1 at Al-Sinaa Stadium, with two goals from Abdul-Zahra to reach the Iraq FA Cup final.

Al-Quwa Al-Jawiya
Al-Quwa Al-Jawiya entered the competition in the Round of 32 as an Iraqi Premier League team but due to the withdrawal of Naft Maysan, Al-Quwa Al-Jawiya gained automatic qualification to the Round of 16. They were drawn against an Iraq Division One team, Al-Jaish away. At Al-Jaish Stadium, Al-Quwa Al-Jawiya won 3–1 with two goals from Emad Muhsin and a goal by Hamid Mido. In the quarterfinals, they drew against Al-Karkh, where they drew in the first leg 1–1 at Al-Quwa Al-Jawiya Stadium with a goal from Mohammed Abdulwahid. In the second leg, they won 1–0 with a goal from Muhsin at Al-Karkh Stadium. In the semifinals, they drew Duhok, where they lost 4–1 in the first leg, at the Duhok Stadium, with a goal from Abdulwahid. In the second leg, at Al-Quwa Al-Jawiya Stadium, they pulled it back, winning 3–0 with goals from Muhsin, Hammadi Ahmed and Hussein Ali Wahid to reach to the Iraq FA Cup final on the away goals rule.

Pre-match
Before the match, a retirement ceremony was held for former Al-Zawraa forward Husham Mohammed.

Match

Details

References

External links
 Iraq Football Association

Football competitions in Iraq
2015–16 in Iraqi football
Iraq FA Cup